In computational learning theory (machine learning and theory of computation), Rademacher complexity, named after Hans Rademacher, measures richness of a class of real-valued functions with respect to a probability distribution.

Definitions

Rademacher complexity of a set 
Given a set , the Rademacher complexity of A is defined as follows:

Some authors take the absolute value of the sum before taking the supremum, but if  is symmetric this makes no difference.

Rademacher complexity of a function class 
Then, the empirical Rademacher complexity of  given  is defined as:

This can also be written using the previous definition:

where  denotes function composition, i.e.:

Intuition 
The Rademacher complexity is typically applied on a function class of models that are used for classification, with the goal of measuring their ability to classify points drawn from a probability space under arbitrary labellings. When the function class is rich enough, it contains functions that can appropriately adapt for each arrangement of labels, simulated by the random draw of  under the expectation, so that this quantity in the sum is maximised.

Examples 
1.  contains a single vector, e.g., . Then:
 
The same is true for every singleton hypothesis class.

2.  contains two vectors, e.g., . Then:

Using the Rademacher complexity 
The Rademacher complexity can be used to derive data-dependent upper-bounds on the learnability of function classes. Intuitively, a function-class with smaller Rademacher complexity is easier to learn.

Bounding the representativeness 
In machine learning, it is desired to have a training set that represents the true distribution of some sample data . This can be quantified using the notion of representativeness. Denote by  the probability distribution from which the samples are drawn. Denote by  the set of hypotheses (potential classifiers) and denote by  the corresponding set of error functions, i.e., for every hypothesis , there is a function , that maps each training sample (features,label) to the error of the classifier  (note in this case hypothesis and classifier are used interchangeably). For example, in the case that  represents a binary classifier, the error function is a 0–1 loss function, i.e. the error function  returns 1 if  correctly classifies a sample and 0 else. We omit the index and write  instead of  when the underlying hypothesis is irrelevant. Define:
 – the expected error of some error function  on the real distribution ;
 – the estimated error of some error function  on the sample .

Smaller representativeness is better, since it provides a way to avoid overfitting: it means that the true error of a classifier is not much higher than its estimated error, and so selecting a classifier that has low estimated error will ensure that the true error is also low. Note however that the concept of representativeness is relative and hence can not be compared across distinct samples.

The expected representativeness of a sample can be bounded above by the Rademacher complexity of the function class:

Bounding the generalization error 
When the Rademacher complexity is small, it is possible to learn the hypothesis class H using empirical risk minimization.

For example, (with binary error function), for every , with probability at least , for every hypothesis :

Bounding the Rademacher complexity 
Since smaller Rademacher complexity is better, it is useful to have upper bounds on the Rademacher complexity of various function sets. The following rules can be used to upper-bound the Rademacher complexity of a set .

1.

2.

3. .

4.

5. The Rademacher complexity of the convex hull of  equals Rad(A).

6. (Massart Lemma) The Rademacher complexity of a finite set grows logarithmically with the set size. Then:

In particular, if  is a set of binary vectors, the norm is at most , so:

Bounds related to the VC dimension 
for all : 
This means that, for every set  with at most  elements, . Substituting this in Massart's lemma gives:

Bounds related to linear classes 

1. Then:

2. Then:

Bounds related to covering numbers 
The following bound relates the Rademacher complexity of a set  to its external covering number – the number of balls of a given radius  whose union contains . The bound is attributed to Dudley.

Suppose  is a set of vectors whose length (norm) is at most . Then, for every integer :

Substituting this in the previous bound gives the following bound on the Rademacher complexity:

Gaussian complexity 
Gaussian and Rademacher complexities are known to be equivalent up to logarithmic factors.

Equivalence of Rademacher and Gaussian complexity 
Given a set  then it holds that:

Where  is the Gaussian Complexity of A

References

 Peter L. Bartlett, Shahar Mendelson (2002) Rademacher and Gaussian Complexities: Risk Bounds and Structural Results. Journal of Machine Learning Research 3 463–482
 Giorgio Gnecco, Marcello Sanguineti (2008) Approximation Error Bounds via Rademacher's Complexity. Applied Mathematical Sciences, Vol. 2, 2008, no. 4, 153–176

Machine learning
Measures of complexity